The Hopman Cup IX corresponds to the ninth edition of the Hopman Cup tournament between nations in men's and women's tennis. The tournament was played between 29 December 1996 and 4 January 1997 at the Burswood Dome in Perth, Western Australia.

Eight teams competed for the title. Croatia were the 1996 champions but they lost in the group stage. The United States took the title after beating South Africa in the final.This was the first year that the tournament was sanctioned by the International Tennis Federation.

Seedings

  – Goran Ivanišević / Iva Majoli
  – Marc Rosset / Martina Hingis
  – Wayne Ferreira / Amanda Coetzer
  – Guy Forget / Mary Pierce

Group A

Standings

Australia vs. Croatia

France vs. United States

Australia vs. France

Croatia vs. United States

Australia vs. United States

Croatia vs. France

Group B

Standings

Romania vs. Switzerland

Germany vs. South Africa

South Africa vs. Switzerland

Germany vs. Romania

Romania vs. South Africa

Germany vs. Switzerland

Final

References

External links

Hopman Cups by year
Hopman Cup